Liege & Lief is the fourth album by the British folk rock band Fairport Convention. It is the third album the group released in the UK during 1969, all of which prominently feature Sandy Denny as lead female vocalist (Denny did not appear on the group's 1968 debut album), as well as the first to feature future long-serving personnel Dave Swarbrick and Dave Mattacks on violin/mandolin and drums, respectively, as full band members (Swarbrick had previously guested on Unhalfbricking). It is also the first Fairport album on which all songs are either adapted (freely) from traditional British and Celtic folk material (for example "Matty Groves", "Tam Lin"), or else are original compositions (such as "Come All Ye", "Crazy Man Michael") written and performed in a similar style. Although Denny and founding bass player Ashley Hutchings quit the band before the album's release, Fairport Convention has continued to the present day to make music strongly based within the British folk rock idiom, and are still the band most prominently associated with it.

The album was moderately successful, peaking at number 17 on the UK Albums Chart during a 15-week run. It is often credited, though the claim is sometimes disputed, as the first major "British folk rock" album (this term is not to be confused with American-style folk rock, which had first achieved mainstream popularity on both sides of the Atlantic with the Byrds' early work several years prior). The popularity of Liege & Lief did a great deal to establish the new style commercially and artistically as a distinct genre. In an audience vote at the BBC Radio 2 Folk Awards in 2006, the album was voted "Most Influential Folk Album of All Time". It was voted number 254 in the third edition of Colin Larkin's All Time Top 1000 Albums (2000).

History
Following the motorway accident that had killed Martin Lamble, the band were left without a drummer. After the release of Unhalfbricking, Dave Mattacks took over the role. Having previously been a drummer at Mecca Ballrooms, he had to "learn a whole new style of drumming." The virtuoso fiddle and mandolin player Dave Swarbrick, a little older than the rest of the band, had already been in a successful duo with guitarist Martin Carthy. After his appearance on Unhalfbricking, he too joined Fairport full-time.

This incarnation of the band, comprising lead vocalist Denny and newcomers Swarbrick and Mattacks, together with founder members Richard Thompson on lead guitar and some vocals, Simon Nicol on rhythm guitar and Ashley Hutchings on electric bass, rehearsed and put together Liege & Lief over the summer of 1969 at a house in Farley Chamberlayne, near Braishfield, Winchester, launching its material with a sold-out concert in London's Royal Festival Hall on 24 September that year. A bootleg/audience recording of that show exists, but in very poor quality.

Gone were the covers of songs by Bob Dylan and others, replaced by electrified versions of traditional English folksongs ("Reynardine", "Matty Groves", "The Deserter", "Tam Lin"), new compositions by band members but with a "traditional" feel ("Come All Ye", "Farewell, Farewell", "Crazy Man Michael"), and the first of a long line of instrumental medleys of folk dance tunes driven by Dave Swarbrick's violin playing. Much of the traditional material had been found by Hutchings in Cecil Sharp's collection, maintained by the English Folk Dance and Song Society, although Swarbrick has elsewhere claimed credit as the source of the traditional material used. Also rehearsed and/or recorded, but omitted from the final album, were versions of The Byrds' "Ballad of Easy Rider", the traditional ballad "Sir Patrick Spens" with Denny on lead vocals, and "The Quiet Joys of Brotherhood", a Richard Fariña  lyric he had set to a traditional Irish melody, the last two of which were to appear in different arrangements on later albums by Fairport Convention and Sandy Denny, respectively.

Of the rehearsal sessions at Farley Chamberlayne that led to the album, Hutchings later said: "It was a magical time ... and there’s a lot of magic on that album. There was a special feeling in the house, in the room, and also a lot of hidden magic and weirdness on that album. The past is weird, you know, our ancestors did a lot of weird things"; while Thompson said: "Nothing resonates like an old song... To sing something beautifully written, and then refined over hundreds of years, that still has meaning and urgency, that still creates vivid pictures in the mind, is a deeply rewarding thing. I think we hoped the band would achieve some mainstream popularity, so that we could bring the tradition a little closer to people's lives."

The album title is composed of two Middle English words: liege meaning loyal and lief meaning ready. The cover, a gatefold in grey and purple, featured cameo images of the band along with track listing and credits. On the inside of the original gatefold cover, a set of illustrated vignettes told the story of ten different aspects of English traditional music and folklore, including notes on customs such as pace-eggers and the Padstow hobby-horse, as well as collectors such as Francis James Child (of "Child Ballads" fame) and Cecil Sharp.

The band toured the UK for several months, also visiting Denmark, performing the Liege & Lief material before recording it in the studio (also including a performance recorded for BBC radio's Top Gear). However, in November 1969, even before the album was released on 2 December, both Hutchings and Denny quit the band: Hutchings to further pursue traditional music in a new band Steeleye Span, and Denny to form her new venture Fotheringay, with more emphasis on her own original compositions. Subsequent to these departures, only Hutchings was replaced (by newcomer Dave Pegg) and thus it was a reduced, 5-man version of the band that went on to record their follow-up album, Full House, the next year.

In 2007 a double album "Liege and Lief Deluxe Edition" was released; the second CD consisted mainly of BBC radio live performances and two stylistically uncharacteristic outtakes, the standards "The Lady Is a Tramp" and "Fly Me to the Moon".

Reception and influence

Liege & Lief was promoted by John Peel on his Top Gear radio programme and the album spent fifteen weeks in the UK album chart, reaching number 17. In a contemporary review, John Mendelsohn of Rolling Stone recommended the album only to devotees of "quietly arty traditional folk" and felt that "Deserter" is the only "arresting" song, as "not even the originals match up to the group-composed material on previous albums." Robert Christgau of The Village Voice was less enthusiastic, writing that because of his "anti-folk" tastes, he was disappointed with the album's more traditional material after Unhalfbricking.

Nevertheless, the album has come to be regarded as a major influence in the development of British folk rock. It was voted the 'most important folk album of all time' by BBC Radio 2 listeners in 2002, and at the 2006 BBC Radio 2 Folk Awards Liege and Lief won the award for Most influential Folk Album of all time. At the event, the original line-up of Simon Nicol, Richard Thompson, Ashley Hutchings, Dave Swarbrick, Dave Mattacks, with Chris While replacing Sandy Denny, performed Matty Groves. Georgia Lucas, the daughter of Sandy Denny and Trevor Lucas, accepted the award on behalf of her late mother. This commemoration was repeated on 10 August 2007 at Cropredy, when the complete album was performed (see "External links"). Prior to that occasion, effective reunions of the Liege and Lief lineup had performed at previous Cropredy festivals, for example with Vikki Clayton standing in for Denny to perform "The Deserter", "Tam Lin" and "Crazy Man Michael" at the 25th anniversary concert in 1992, and the same line-up performing "Come All Ye", "Reynardine" and "Matty Groves" at the 1997 30th anniversary concert.

In a retrospective review, AllMusic's Mark Deming said of the album that "while [it] was the most purely folk-oriented Fairport Convention album to date, it also rocked hard in a thoroughly original and uncompromising way". In June 2007, Mojo magazine listed Liege & Lief at number 58 in its list of "100 Records that changed the world". In his 2010 book on the UK folk-rock music scene Electric Eden, author Rob Young devoted 13 pages to the Liege and Lief period and its resulting album, stating that the album "retains a coherence and integrity shared by very few British folk-rock records" and that in its music, "... Fate is exacted; English balladry displays its full menace and mystery; and there's a tentative reflection upon pain and loss, tainted by hard experience". For Patrick Humphries, on the other hand, writing in 1996, the album is less than 100% successful: "Come all Ye" sounds "rather forced", the band's reading of "The Deserter" is described as "pedestrian", and "Tam Lin" is described as "leaden" and the soloing on it as "timid"; he does, however, praise "Matty Groves" as "relish[ing] the interplay between Swarbrick and Thompson", "Reynardine" for the quality of Denny's singing, the instrumental medley as giving Swarbrick's fiddle a chance to shine (along with Thompson's and Hutchings' guitar and bass contributions), "Crazy Man Michael" as "a substantial conclusion to the album", and "Farewell, Farewell" as "a flawless example of what Fairport were capable of at their peak."

Track listing

Tracks 4, 5, 6, and 7 on disc two were recorded live for John Peel's  BBC Top Gear show. They first aired on 27 September 1969. Track 10 is previously unissued.

Production
Produced by Joe Boyd for Witchseason Productions, Ltd.
Recorded at Sound Techniques Ltd., London
Engineered by John Wood
Cover photography – Eric Hayes
Sleeve concept & design – Fairport & Roberta Nicol
Design co-ordination – Diogenic Attempts Ltd

Personnel 
 Sandy Denny – vocals
 Dave Swarbrick – fiddle, viola
 Richard Thompson –  electric & acoustic guitars, backing vocals
 Simon Nicol – electric, 6-string & 12-string acoustic guitars, backing vocals
 Ashley Hutchings – bass guitar, backing vocals
 Dave Mattacks – drums, percussion

Notes

References

Bibliography
 Heylin, Clinton. No More Sad Refrains - The Life and Times of Sandy Denny. Helter Skelter, 2000; 
 Hinton, Brian and Wall, Geoff. Ashley Hutchings - The Guv'nor and the Rise of Folk Rock. Helter Skelter, 2002; 
 Houghton, Mick. I've Always Kept a Unicorn - The Biography of Sandy Denny. Faber & Faber, 2015; 
 Humphries, Patrick. Meet on the Ledge - A History of Fairport Convention. Eel Pie, 1982; 
 Humphries, Patrick. Richard Thompson - Strange Affair: The Biography. Virgin Books, 1996; 
 Hutchings, Ashley. A Little Music. Island Music, 1976 (no ISBN)
 Young, Rob. Electric Eden - Unearthing Britain's Visionary Music. Faber & Faber, 2010;  (includes an extensive account of the Liege and Lief period and resulting album on p. 253-265)

External links

"The Liege & Lief story" from a version of Fairport Convention's official website found on the Wayback Machine
Joe Boyd discusses Liege and Lief for Classic Album Sundays at Bestival 2014 (video on YouTube)
Fairport Convention with Chris While: Liege and Lief (revisited) live performance at 2007 Cropredy Festival, U.K. (BBC broadcast) - mp3 audio recording (set list, .wma, .asx versions also available via http://tela.sugarmegs.org/alpha/f.html)

Fairport Convention albums
1969 albums
Island Records albums
Albums produced by Joe Boyd
A&M Records albums